Gregory E. Sterling is an American religious scholar, academic and researcher. He is the Reverend Henry L. Slack Dean and Lillian Claus Professor of New Testament at Yale Divinity School. He is a former dean of the Graduate School of University of Notre Dame where he also served on the faculty for 23 years.

Sterling focuses on Hellenistic Judaism and has published over 100 scholarly papers on, among other subjects, the writings of Philo of Alexandria, Josephus, and Luke–Acts. He has focused on the ways Second Temple Jews and early Christians interacted with one another and with the Greco-Roman world. Sterling is the author of Historiography and Self-Definition: Josephos, Luke-Acts, and Apologetic Historiography, Armenian Paradigms and Coptic Paradigms: A Summary of Sahidic Coptic Morphology and the editor or co-editor of five other books.

Sterling is the General Editor of Philo of Alexandria Commentary Series by E. J. Brill and Co-Editor of the Studia Philonica Annual. He is a minister in the Churches of Christ.

Education
Sterling received his bachelor's degree in Christianity and History in 1978 and completed post-baccalaureate studies in classics in the following year at Houston Baptist University. He then received his master's degree in Religion degree from Pepperdine University in 1980 and his Masters in Classics degree from University of California in 1982. In 1990, he completed his Doctoral studies in Biblical Studies with a specialization in the New Testament from the Graduate Theological Union in Berkeley.

Career
Sterling joined the faculty at the University of Notre Dame in 1989 as a Visiting Assistant Professor and became a regular member of the faculty in 1990. He was promoted to Associate Professor in 1995 and to Professor of Theology in 2000. After teaching as Professor at University of Notre Dame for twenty-three years, Sterling left the University and was appointed by Yale University in 2012, as the Lillian Claus Professor of New Testament at Yale Divinity School and Professor of Religion in Department of Religious Studies.

At the University of Notre Dame, Sterling was appointed as Director of Graduate Studies for the Department of Theology, Associate Dean of the Faculty and Executive Associate Dean for the College of Arts and Letters, and Dean of the Graduate School in 1997, 2001, 2006 and 2008, respectively. In 2012, he was appointed as Reverend Henry L. Slack Dean of Yale Divinity School.

Research
Sterling focuses on Hellenistic Judaism and has worked on New Testament and early Mediterranean and West-Asian religions. He has conducted research on the writings of Philo of Alexandria, Josephus, and Luke-Acts, and has focused on the interactions between Second Temple Jews and early Christians, as well as on the ways these groups related to the Greco-Roman world, especially in the areas of historiography and philosophy.

Awards and honors
1999 - Presidential Award, University of Notre Dame
2012 - M.A. honoris causa, Yale University
2018 - Alumnus of the Year, Graduate Theological Union
2018 – 40 over 40 (Top 40 alumni over 40), Pepperdine University

Bibliography

Books
Historiography and Self-Definition: Josephos, Luke-Acts, and Apologetic Historiography (1992) 
Armenian Paradigms (2004) 
Historiography and Self-Definition: Josephos, Luke-Acts, and Apologetic Historiography (2006) 
Coptic Paradigms: A Summary of Sahidic Coptic Morphology (2008)

Selected articles
"Wisdom among the Perfect: Creation Traditions in Alexandrian Judaism and Corinthian Christianity." Novum Testamentum 37 (1995): 355–84.
"Platonizing Moses: Philo and Middle Platonism." The Studia Philonica Annual 5 (1993): 96-111.
"'The Most Ancient and Reliable Record of the Past': The Jewish Appropriation of Hellenistic Historiography." pp. 231–43 in Companion to Greek & Roman Historiography .Edited by John Marincola. Oxford: Blackwell.
"'The School of Sacred Laws': The Social Setting of Philo's Treatises." Vigiliae Christianae 53 (1999):148-64.
"'Athletes of Virtue': An Analysis of the Summaries in Acts (2:41-47; 4:32-35; 5:12-16)." Journal of Biblical Literature 113 (1994): 679–96.
"'A Law to Themselves': Limited Universalism in Philo and Paul." Zeitschrift für die neutestamentliche Wissenschaft und die Kunde der älteren Kirche 107 (2016): 30–47.

References 

Living people
1954 births
American academic administrators
American religion academics
Yale Divinity School faculty
Houston Christian University alumni
Pepperdine University alumni